John Hickes or Hicks (1633–1685), was an English nonconformist minister.

Hickes was the brother of George Hickes, born at Moorhouse, Kirby Wiske, North Riding of Yorkshire. He was a student and then fellow of Trinity College, Dublin. He was ejected from Saltash, Cornwall after the Uniformity Act of 1662.

Hickes presented a petition to Charles II in favour of nonconformists. Under James II he joined the Duke of Monmouth's Rebellion in 1685 and was sheltered by Alice Lisle. He was tried and executed at Taunton.

References

1633 births
1685 deaths
Ejected English ministers of 1662
Fellows of Trinity College Dublin
People from Hambleton District
Clergy from Yorkshire